Tuzapán (Tuxpan) was founded by the Native Americans of Papantla, Veracruz.

Populated places in Veracruz
Totonac